Vadakarapathy is a gram panchayat in the Palakkad district, state of Kerala, India. It is a local government organisation serving the villages of Vadakarapathy and Ozhalapathy.

References 

Gram panchayats in Palakkad district